Pekka Hjelt (born 22 September 1949) is a Finnish wrestler. He competed in the men's Greco-Roman 62 kg at the 1976 Summer Olympics.

References

1949 births
Living people
Finnish male sport wrestlers
Olympic wrestlers of Finland
Wrestlers at the 1976 Summer Olympics
Sportspeople from Helsinki